Daeamsan  is a mountain in the province of Gangwon-do, South Korea. It sits on the boundary between the counties of Inje and Yanggu.

See also

List of mountains in Korea
The High Moor, Yongneup of Mt. Daeam

Notes

References

Mountains of Gangwon Province, South Korea
Inje County
Yanggu County, Gangwon
Mountains of South Korea
One-thousanders of South Korea